Hogwarts Legacy is a 2023 action role-playing game developed by Avalanche Software and published by Warner Bros. Games under its Portkey Games label. The game is set in the Wizarding World universe, taking place in the late 1800s, a century prior to the events chronicled in the Harry Potter novels. The player controls a student enrolled in the Hogwarts School of Witchcraft and Wizardry who learns to wield an array of magical abilities and objects. With the assistance of fellow students and professors, the protagonist embarks on a journey to unearth an ancient secret that has long been concealed within the wizarding world. 

Hogwarts Legacy marks Avalanche's first release since their acquisition by Warner Bros. in 2017. The game's development commenced in 2018, while pre-release gameplay footage was leaked onto the internet in the same year. Following its official announcement in 2020, the game garnered significant anticipation. Prior to its release, it attracted controversy due to Harry Potter creator J. K. Rowling's views on transgender people and accusations of including antisemitic tropes, leading to calls for a boycott. Following some delays, it was released on 10 February 2023 for PlayStation 5, Windows, and Xbox Series X/S. It is scheduled for release on PlayStation 4, Xbox One in May and Nintendo Switch in July 2023.

The early access period of Hogwarts Legacy resulted in record-breaking viewership on streaming platform Twitch, making it the most-watched single-player game of all time. Within two weeks after its launch, the game sold more than 12 million copies, generated $850 million in global sales revenue, and accumulated over 280 million hours played globally, breaking company records for Warner Bros. Games. Hogwarts Legacy received generally favourable reviews from critics, with praise for its combat, world design, characters, and faithfulness to the source material, and criticism for its technical problems and failure to innovate as an open-world game.

Gameplay
Hogwarts Legacy is an action role-playing game, played in a third-person perspective. It is set in Hogwarts School of Witchcraft and Wizardry and its surrounding areas, influenced by the Wizarding World franchise. The player can explore familiar locations such as Hogsmeade and the Forbidden Forest. One of the main elements for the player is to attend classes. Each of the four known Hogwarts Houses—Gryffindor, Hufflepuff, Ravenclaw and Slytherin—also offers a unique common room; these rooms are only accessible for the player's current house chosen by the Sorting Hat. Accompanied by the choice of house, the player receives different exclusive quests. Progressing through the game sees the interior and exterior of the castle change visually to match the seasons. The game also features changing music based on the location of the player character, as they move through the open world, with notable differences within the specific common rooms that can only be accessed by players who choose each corresponding school house.

During character creation, the player can choose their appearance, gender, and one of the four houses. Players may customise their character's voice and body type. Level progression allows the player to access and upgrade different spells, talents, and abilities. Through in-game challenges, the player character gains experience points to gain levels. These challenges come in the form of combat, quests, exploration, and field guide pages. While house points for the four Hogwarts houses play a part in the game's plot, they are not influenced by player actions. The player character learns to cast various magical spells, brew potions and master combat abilities. As players progress, they develop their own special combat style. Classes will be attended as a part of the story, advancing gameplay mechanics. Player characters are also able to establish friendships with interactable non-player characters (NPCs). As these relationships grow, schoolmates become companions who can accompany players on their journey, expand their abilities, and offer unique companion quests as players learn their stories.

The game features environmental customisation elements; players can modify the Room of Requirement with multiple objects as they progress through the game. The room can be entirely personalised, and its architecture changed. It is used to place and take care of utility items such as brewing stations and planting pots, which also can be customised. Some of the magical beasts of the game can be held in a chosen "Vivarium", a separate place where the player takes care of them. Players will be able to tame, care for, and ride different magical beasts, including hippogriffs and thestrals. Other interactable magical creatures included are dragons, unicorns, kneazles, and puffskeins. Some creatures can be used in combat, such as mandrakes to stun enemies.

Synopsis

Setting and characters
Hogwarts Legacy is set in the late 1800s, taking place in several Wizarding World locations such as Hogwarts castle, Hogsmeade and the Scottish Highlands. The player takes on the role of a student (voiced by Sebastian Croft or Amelia Gething) starting their studies at Hogwarts in the fifth year. As the protagonist begins school later than other students, the Ministry of Magic provides a wizard field guide. Completing sections of this guide through exploration provides additional information and experience points. The player character possesses the power to control a mysterious ancient magic and holds the key to an "ancient secret" that threatens the stability of the wizarding world. Their mission is to discover the reasons behind the resurgence of this forgotten magic and those who are trying to harness its power.

The game introduced several new characters, with Professor Eleazar Fig being an essential character as the mentor in the player's journey. Fig is a wizard who teaches at Hogwarts and investigates the mystery of Ranrok's rebellion. Other new characters the protagonist meets include Hogwarts students Amit Thakkar (Asif Ali) and Everett Clopton (Luke Youngblood), Professors Onai (Kandace Caine) and Shah (Sohm Kapila), as well as headmaster Phineas Nigellus Black (Simon Pegg) and Professor Matilda Weasley (Lesley Nicol). The protagonist is also able to build friendships with fellow students Natsai Onai, Poppy Sweeting and Sebastian Sallow, who take part in the protagonist's journey as companion characters. Antagonists featured in the game include Ranrok, the leader of the Goblin Rebellion, and Victor Rookwood, the leader of a group of Dark Wizards.

Plot
The protagonist receives a letter from Professor Weasley, containing the confirmation of attending Hogwarts School of Witchcraft and Wizardry as a fifth-year student, with Professor Fig assigned as the protagonist's mentor. Fig escorts the protagonist from London to Hogwarts via a flying coach. While discussing an unknown artefact, a dragon attacks them. When the dragon rips the coach apart, Fig and the protagonist reach for the key that was inside the artefact, revealed to be a Portkey that teleports the duo to Gringotts. Using the key to enter an old vault, the protagonist learns they can see traces of ancient magic. The duo is confronted by a hostile goblin named Ranrok. Fig and the protagonist escape to Hogwarts, right as the Sorting Ceremony is about to end. The protagonist is sorted into one of the four Houses and begins their term at Hogwarts.

The protagonist learns various spells during classes, while also exploring Hogwarts, Hogsmeade, and outer regions with companions Sebastian Sallow, Poppy Sweeting, and Natsai Onai. Meanwhile, Professor Fig is investigating the secrets of ancient magic, supported by the protagonist. They ultimately discover a secret room below Hogwarts known as The Map Chamber. The chamber contains four talking portraits of past Hogwarts professors who refer to themselves as "Keepers", led by Percival Rackham; their goal is to protect the secrets of ancient magic from the Wizarding World. The protagonist learns that the fifth Keeper, Isidora Morganach, disagreed with the other four as to the use of ancient magic, leaving a repository of power that Ranrok is attempting to find, as he wishes for goblins to rise up against the wizarding world. A group of dark wizards, led by Keeper Charles Rookwood's descendant Victor, collaborates with Ranrok in exchange for a share of his power.

In order to reveal the secrets of ancient magic, the protagonist must complete four trials left by the Keepers. Each trial features dangerous and complicated puzzles requiring the use of spells the protagonist has learned over the game, each trial leading to a "pensieve", a magical device to store and review memories. Each pensieve reveals the history of ancient magic and its connection to Isidora, who used ancient magic in an attempt to "cure" negative emotions, particularly from her suffering father. The Keepers realised that Isidora was inhaling the extracted emotions to increase her own power, draining students' emotions into a large repository of ancient magic. The Keepers failed in their attempt to dissuade her from doing this. With no alternative in sight, one of the Keepers ultimately used the killing curse to eliminate Isidora. The Keepers decided to keep the repository a secret. As the protagonist completes all trials, they receive one final task: to create a special type of magic wand consisting of the artefacts found at the pensieves.

Professor Fig sends the protagonist to Ollivander in order to craft the Keeper's wand. As the protagonist leaves Ollivander's, they are ambushed by Victor, who proposes an alliance against the goblins. The protagonist refuses, resulting in a battle in which the protagonist manages to defeat Victor. Shortly after, Ranrok locates Isidora's repository and "frees" the ancient power, absorbing it to turn himself into a dragon. Fig is mortally wounded, and the protagonist battles the dragon, ending the goblin rebellion by destroying Ranrok, and must decide whether to seal the magic away or absorb the power for themselves. Regardless of the choice, Fig dies, and Headmaster Black and Professor Weasley hold a eulogy in honour of him. The protagonist returns to finish regular school studies, as the end of the school year is leading to the O.W.L. exams. The journey ends with Professor Weasley awarding the protagonist 100 house points for the extraordinary adventure, which ultimately leads to a win of the House Cup for their respective House.

Development
Hogwarts Legacy was developed by Avalanche Software, which was acquired by Warner Bros. Interactive Entertainment from Disney in January 2017. In the same year, Warner Bros. established a new publishing label named Portkey Games, which was dedicated to managing the Wizarding World license. The open world game was developed by utilizing the Unreal Engine, its fourth generation in particular. J. K. Rowling, the author of the Harry Potter series, was not directly involved in development. However, Warner Bros. acknowledged that her literary works served as the basis for all projects in the Wizarding World. Five years in the making, experts estimate Hogwarts Legacy's budget at $150 million.

Lead designer Troy Leavitt stated that the studio had the flexibility to select the elements that fans were most enthusiastic about. He also mentioned that Hogwarts Legacy was designed to give fans the "wizarding world experience" they always desired while reading the books or watching the movies, without any particular agenda or message. Leavitt drew significant criticism in February 2021 due to a series of social media posts and videos where he expressed support for cultural appropriation and Gamergate. Amid the controversy, he resigned from his roles at both Avalanche Software and the Hogwarts Legacy project. He emphasised that his decision to leave was not influenced by the negative feedback he received. Warner Bros. did not provide any comment on the issue. Also working in game design, Troy Johnson elaborated that with the advancements in modern technology and gaming consoles, it was possible to create a competent game based on the Wizarding World. The open world of the game was intentionally designed to fulfill two primary goals: to allow players overall freedom while playing the game and to offer opportunities to craft a gaming experience that is highly personalised and can be enjoyed in their own unique way.

In the matter of story development, Narrative lead Moira Squier stated that it was important to pick a time period when no other heroes were around. This made it possible to provide the player their own complete world to experience in a setting similar to the Harry Potter and Fantastic Beasts eras. The writing team focused on creating a "diverse collection" of characters for players to potentially identify with them in a positive way. Although the main cast is absent in Hogwarts Legacy, there are some familiar faces making an appearance, such as Nearly Headless Nick and Peeves the poltergeist. The team also introduced a trans-inclusive character creator and the franchise's first transgender character, Sirona Ryan. Boston Madsen, environmental lead for the creation of Hogwarts, emphasised the importance of creating environmental elements close to the source material of the Harry Potter books. Madsen stated that even though its Avalanche Software's version of Hogwarts, it is made to be easily recognisable. Game director Alan Tew also added that they aimed to go beyond the expected areas to let people discover new locations and undiscovered chambers. Tew and Madsen further explained that they endeavored to provide each common room of the four Hogwarts Houses as a unique experience to its members, which is further amplified by the addition of uniquely created music for each house. The overarching aim was to create a welcoming atmosphere that fosters a sense of nostalgia and belonging. The magic village Hogsmeade was created to feature well-known establishments like The Three Broomsticks Inn, a popular gathering place for both villagers and students. Other created locations in the area include Hog’s Head, an inn with a less favorable reputation, and Zonko’s, the go-to store for novelty tricks. The game also was designed to feature less densely populated areas, offering players plenty of opportunities for exploration, where they may discover a variety of local flora and fauna to use in spell and potion crafting.

Artists Jeff Bunker and Vanessa Palmer explained that, during the game's development, they kept five specific tech pillars in mind: 4K graphics and visuals, 3D audio, activities and game help and the PlayStation 5 DualSense controller as well as fast loading times and activities. They referenced the usage of the Unreal Engine, the computing and rendering capabilities of the PlayStation 5, and the Niagara visual effects system to deliver visual effects for spells and magic. Avalanche Software's team made use of the DualSense controller's adaptive triggers with haptic feedback to create an immersive and authentic combat experience. As well as combat, the haptic experience was included to enhance flying and discovering ancient magic hotspots.

Music 
The soundtrack was composed by Peter Murray, J. Scott Rakozy and Chuck Myers, including additional tracks by Alexander Horowitz. According to Myers, the development process lasted nearly four years. Audio production coordinator Nathan Ayuobi noted that while they took inspiration from composer John Williams' previous Harry Potter-related work, they concentrated on forging their unique style.  In a behind-the-scenes video, composers Murray and Rakozy commented on the creation of the Hogwarts Legacy soundtrack. They explained that the challenge of its creative process was to balance the original composition with the existing music of the Wizarding World films. One of the songs, Overture to the Unwritten, was released prior to the soundtrack. The song was performed by the Seven Springs Symphony Orchestra & Choir as a live capture of a 54-piece orchestra.

In January 2023, the release of the soundtrack was announced to happen simultaneously with Hogwarts Legacy. It was released as two digital double albums totalling 75 tracks, Hogwarts Legacy (Original Video Game Soundtrack) and Hogwarts Legacy (Study Themes from the Original Video Game Soundtrack). The soundtrack was also released on vinyl, being mastered by James Plotkin and distributed by Mondo.

Release 
Before any official statement on the development or release of Hogwarts Legacy, gameplay footage leaked in 2018. Hogwarts Legacy was officially announced at a PlayStation 5 event in September 2020, with a planned release for PlayStation 4, PlayStation 5, Windows, Xbox One, and Xbox Series X/S in 2021. It was delayed twice, first to 2022, and later to 10 February 2023. The game's PS4 and Xbox One versions were also delayed twice from its February 2023 launch to May. A Nintendo Switch port is scheduled for release on 25 July 2023. The game was made available in three versions, namely: Standard Edition, Deluxe Edition, and Collector's Edition. Buyers of the Standard edition also have the option to upgrade to the Deluxe Edition by buying the additional content separately. Early access was made available to people who had pre-ordered the game's physical Collector's Edition or Digital Deluxe Edition on console or PC on 7 February 2023. The game made several lists of the most anticipated games of 2023: CNET, CNN, Den of Geek, GameSpot, IGN, PC Games, NPR, Polygon, Time, VentureBeat, and VG247. To promote the game, a specifically designed DualSense controller, the "Revelio Controller", was released at the game's launch in the U.S. and UK as a limited edition.

Following the release of the first gameplay trailer in March 2022, the game received criticism for basing it in the Goblin Rebellion era of Wizarding World history, with the game's storyline focusing on the player suppressing a goblin rebellion. The Wizarding World lore surrounding goblins has previously been accused of being based on antisemitic tropes. The criticism stemmed from the belief that the game's core message was that the minority goblin group should be considered the enemy for rebelling against their oppressor and fighting for freedom and equal rights. According to The Mary Sue, the central plot-line was compared by some social media users to the antisemitic blood libel myth, in which Jews were accused of using the blood of Christian children in rituals, though they admitted this may simply be a coincidence.

However, the portrayal of goblins in both the game and the larger Harry Potter universe has been defended by some.The non-governmental organization Campaign Against Antisemitism argued that the depiction is consistent with how goblins have been portrayed in Western literature over the centuries and is not evidence of malice on the part of contemporary artists. The statement also commended Rowling for her tireless efforts in defending the Jewish community. In an exchange with The Times of Israel, Travis Northup of IGN disagreed with the idea that the game contained antisemitic tropes. He pointed out that the story did not feature a group of goblins controlling banks or attempting to seize power, but rather focused on a single goblin who rebelled against the Wizarding World's demand of denying magical access to his kind. Jewish comedian and political commentator Jon Stewart, who was previously reported by several media to have made the same accusations, retorted the next day that he was misrepresented and that he did not think the goblins' portrayal in Harry Potter or J.K. Rowling herself were antisemitic. He added that antisemitic tropes are so ingrained in society that they are almost impossible to spot.

Shortly before the release of Hogwarts Legacy, a dedicated page was created with the sole purpose of targeting Twitch streamers who played the game. The web tool in question filtered accounts streaming the game, leading to the harassment of some. The page was taken down shortly after. Following Hogwarts Legacys early-access release on 7 February 2023, some content creators and streamers were criticised and harassed by others opposed to Rowling's views for promoting and broadcasting the game. As a result, some streamers ultimately decided to not stream the game at all, with Polygon noting that it occurred either in favour of ongoing protests or for fear of harassment. Despite the efforts to boycott the game, its viewership on live-streaming service Twitch peaked at a record-breaking 1.27 million concurrent viewers on 7 February. This made Hogwarts Legacy the most-watched single-player game of all time by peak viewers on the platform.

Hogwarts Legacy became a subject of contention in response to Rowling's controversial views on transgender people. Many in opposition to Rowling called for a boycott of the game as a means of showing solidarity with the transgender community, and to impede the financial benefits she would receive from its release. Others felt that Hogwarts Legacy could be separated from the views of its universe's creator. On behalf of Warner Bros. Interactive Entertainment and in light of the controversy, President David Haddad stated that Rowling has the right to hold her personal viewpoint. Several weeks before the game's launch, actor Sebastian Croft, who voiced the protagonist in the game, distanced himself from Rowling's views. Writing for GameSpot, the transgender YouTuber Jessie Earl wrote that those on each side of the debate should come to their own conclusions. While she felt it was not wrong to want to play Hogwarts Legacy, those who did should not claim to be supportive of the trans community.

Additional content 
By joining the Harry Potter Fan Club and linking the WB Games account, players were able to receive free cosmetic items. PlayStation versions of the game include "The Haunted Hogsmeade Shop" as exclusive content and the recipe for the "Felix Felicis" potion as a pre-order exclusive. The former consists of an additional dungeon, cosmetic set and the feature of owning an in-game shop, while the latter allows the player to reveal gear chests on the map. Accompanied by the launch of Hogwarts Legacy, the Dark Arts Pack was released as either a part of the Deluxe and Collector's editions or as downloadable content (DLC) for users of the regular edition. The DLC consists of an exclusive mount, a clothing set and a new battle arena location. The Dark Arts Battle Arena expands the two available battle arenas available in the base game. Since the early access release on 7 February 2023 up until 24 February 2023, players were able to receive five free cosmetic items exclusively through Twitch drops. In February 2023, shortly after the release, game director Alan Tew stated that the team focused on the launch only and did not plan to release additional content yet.

Reception

Critical response
According to review aggregator Metacritic, Hogwarts Legacy received "generally favourable" reviews, based on 20 reviews for PC, 92 reviews for the PlayStation 5 and 19 reviews for the Xbox Series X. The game was nominated for "Most Anticipated Game" at the Game Awards 2022 and for "Most Wanted Game" at the Golden Joystick Awards 2022.

The environments and visuals were lauded by critics, with the majority of praise for the recreation of Hogwarts castle. GamesRadar+ complimented the world as being faithful to the existing Wizarding World lore, and Destructoid lauded the overall presentation and positive synergy with the universe. Other reviewers echoed these points, with NME writing that the world was probably "the best representation for fans". Further praise was directed at the castle's level of detail. Push Square highlighted the level of atmosphere and visual presentation, finding it made aimless activities like walking around Hogwarts enjoyable. The surrounding areas set in the Scottish Highlands received similar plaudits, though some thought that other areas were not as engaging.

The gameplay elements received varying reviews. PC Gamer praised Legacys "simple but harmonious systems", such as its take on wizard duels and building a personalised living space in the Room of Requirement. Eurogamer Germany lauded the attention to detail in motivating the player to explore the world. They highlighted the "atmospheric" music and were impressed by the design of some of the game's quests and puzzles. Destructoid complimented the range of activities and unlockables, but found the game "unremarkable" overall and contributing to the experience being "wrapped in a flawed open world shell". NME similarly wrote that the game design felt dated, attributing this to its long development cycle. The Guardian criticised the experience as "competent but unspectacular". While praising the presentation as "enchanting", they felt that progression made the game feel more derivative of other open-world examples. GameRevolution described Legacy as fun but forgettable Harry Potter fan service, writing that features such as attending classes and creating potions lacked sufficient depth. The combat was generally praised. PCGamesN called it the game's strongest aspect. The A.V. Club deemed it as the most interesting feature, calling the more challenging fights "legitimately thrilling". GameSpot described the combat and spells as giving "a great sense of power" for the player, though criticised the spell-selecting controls and the "uninteresting" enemy design; Game Informer similarly lamented the enemies for lacking in variety.

The game's narrative divided critics. Some praised the developer's handling of the narrative to tell an original story while in a setting that felt overly familiar. Windows Central and Screen Rant deemed the story "engaging", while the writing of the more detailed side-quests was positively highlighted by Video Games Chronicle as "sit[ting] comfortably with the best of the series". Hardcore Gamer praised the story as "gripping", but felt it faltered towards the end. PCMag described the decision to have the protagonist act out a "Chosen One" role as "silly". Other reviewers expressed overall criticism of the narrative, finding it to be lacklustre, and at times illogical.

The characters were mostly well received. Windows Central described them as interesting and adding depth to the world. CNET complimented them as being "richly" written, and positively remarked upon their ethnic diversity, the latter sentiment was echoed by PCMag. IGN praised the companions for their characterization and roles. The cast performances received similar compliments; PCMag wrote that their quality made conversations feel natural. Conversely, Video Games Chronicle criticised certain NPCs outside of Hogwarts for appearing lifeless. Hardcore Gamer wrote the protagonist's rivals, Ranrok and Rookwood, failed as compelling antagonists and felt disappointing compared to other established Harry Potter villains.

Reviewers were critical of Legacys technical aspects. PC Gamer experienced brief but frequent pauses at doors, as well as frame rate drops during uneventful moments. Eurogamer Germany noted shading issues and "stiff" facial expressions on character models, and CNET thought that their eye movements occasionally felt unnatural. Many noted a number of technical issues in the game affecting performance, including slow loading of textures, frame rate inconsistencies, visual glitches, clipping objects and inconsistent lighting. GameStar reported performance problems overall while reviewing the PC version, especially in areas with many NPCs, but noticed the game's first patch alleviated some of these issues.

As a result of the controversy surrounding Rowling, some publications chose not to cover or review Hogwarts Legacy, and the online forum ResetEra banned discussion of it. Wired reviewed the game but gave it the lowest possible score, stating that it was mediocre and harmful. The review was noted to be focused on political grounds, which drew criticism by some conservative reports. Responding to the controversy, the studio added that the development focused on creating a rich and diverse world which would represent all groups of people. Transgender character Sirona Ryan's inclusion was dismissed by some as insincere, while those involved in development allegedly stated that the character added nothing substantial and was solely created to avert criticism.

Sales

Overall, experts estimated the game to sell at least 10 million copies, while also speculating that Hogwarts Legacy will be an opportunity to re-brand the franchise. On 23 February 2023, Warner Bros. Discovery announced that the game has sold more than 12 million copies in its first two weeks, generating $850 million in global sales. In Europe, Hogwarts Legacys launch sales placed it as the sixth biggest launch for a video game since the creation of the European Monthly Charts. In the UK, the game became the biggest launch of any Harry Potter video game, topping the Boxed Chart in its debut week. Analysts compared the first week sales to Elden Ring, noting that physical and digital sales are up by 80% and 88%. It remained at the top of the UK physical charts for four additional weeks. In Japan, Hogwarts Legacy debuted atop the software sales chart, with the PlayStation 5 version selling 67,196 physical copies. The game remained one additional week at the top spot and, as of 2 March 2023, accumulated a total of 139,535 physical copies sold. Legacy has sold more than 600,000 copies in Germany within a period of two and a half weeks, making it one of the most successful games of both 2022 and 2023. Due to Steam's rules on separating pre-orders and official releases, Hogwarts Legacy occupied the first four spots on the platform's sales chart at some point during its first week of release. On PlayStation 5 and Xbox Series X/S, Hogwarts Legacy placed atop of the console's sales charts before its official launch.

As of 22 February 2023, Hogwarts Legacy had been played for a collected amount of 267 million hours. Shortly after, the game broke company records for Warner Bros. Games by reaching 280 million hours played. In further regards to player engagement, Hogwarts Legacy reached a peak of over 489,000 concurrent players on Steam during its early access, becoming the second-highest player count peak for any single-player game, behind only Cyberpunk 2077. After its release, the game almost doubled its concurrent player record during release weekend, peaking at over 879,000 players. The game has the eighth-highest concurrent player peak ever.

See also

Notes

References

External links

2023 video games
Action role-playing video games
Articles containing video clips
Avalanche Software games
Blood libel
Harry Potter controversies
Harry Potter video games
High school-themed video games
LGBT-related controversies in video games
Nintendo Switch games
Open-world video games
PlayStation 4 games
PlayStation 5 games
Race-related controversies in video games
Single-player video games
Unreal Engine games
Video game controversies
Video games based on novels
Video games developed in the United States
Video games featuring protagonists of selectable gender
Video game prequels
Video games set in castles
Video games set in Scotland
Video games set in the 19th century
Warner Bros. video games
Windows games
Xbox One games
Xbox Series X and Series S games